In classical electromagnetism, Ampère's circuital law (not to be confused with Ampère's force law) relates the integrated magnetic field around a closed loop to the electric current passing through the loop. James Clerk Maxwell (not Ampère) derived it using hydrodynamics in his 1861 published paper "On Physical Lines of Force" In 1865 he generalized the equation to apply to time-varying currents by adding the displacement current term, resulting in the modern form of the law, sometimes called the Ampère–Maxwell law, which is one of Maxwell's equations which form the basis of classical electromagnetism.

Maxwell's original circuital law
In 1820 Danish physicist Hans Christian Ørsted  discovered that an electric current creates a magnetic field around it, when he noticed that the needle of a compass next to a wire carrying current turned so that the needle was perpendicular to the wire.   He investigated and discovered the rules which govern the field around a straight current-carrying wire:
The magnetic field lines encircle the current-carrying wire.
The magnetic field lines lie in a plane perpendicular to the wire.
If the direction of the current is reversed, the direction of the magnetic field reverses.
The strength of the field is directly proportional to the magnitude of the current.
The strength of the field at any point is inversely proportional to the distance of the point from the wire.
This sparked a great deal of research into the relation between electricity and magnetism.  André-Marie Ampère investigated the magnetic force between two current-carrying wires, discovering Ampère's force law.  In the 1850s Scottish mathematical physicist James Clerk Maxwell generalized these results and others into a single mathematical law.  The original form of Maxwell's circuital law, which he derived as early as 1855 in his paper "On Faraday's Lines of Force" based on an analogy to hydrodynamics, relates magnetic fields to electric currents that produce them. It determines the magnetic field associated with a given current, or the current associated with a given magnetic field.

The original circuital law only applies to a magnetostatic situation, to continuous steady currents flowing in a closed circuit. For systems with electric fields that change over time, the original law (as given in this section) must be modified to include a term known as Maxwell's correction (see below).

Equivalent forms
The original circuital law can be written in several different forms, which are all ultimately equivalent:

 An "integral form" and a "differential form". The forms are exactly equivalent, and related by the Kelvin–Stokes theorem (see the "proof" section below).
 Forms using SI units, and those using cgs units. Other units are possible, but rare. This section will use SI units, with cgs units discussed later.
 Forms using either  or  magnetic fields. These two forms use the total current density and free current density, respectively. The  and  fields are related by the constitutive equation:  in non-magnetic materials where  is the magnetic constant.

Explanation

The integral form of the original circuital law is a line integral of the magnetic field around some closed curve  (arbitrary but must be closed). The curve  in turn bounds both a surface  which the electric current passes through (again arbitrary but not closed—since no three-dimensional volume is enclosed by ), and encloses the current. The mathematical statement of the law is a relation between the total amount of magnetic field around some path (line integral) due to the current which passes through that enclosed path (surface integral).

In terms of total current, (which is the sum of both free current and bound current) the line integral of the magnetic -field (in teslas, T) around closed curve  is proportional to the total current  passing through a surface  (enclosed by ). In terms of free current, the line integral of the magnetic -field (in amperes per metre, A·m−1) around closed curve  equals the free current  through a surface .

  is the total current density (in amperes per square metre, A·m−2),
  is the free current density only,
  is the closed line integral around the closed curve ,
  is the vector dot product,
  is an infinitesimal element (a differential) of the curve  (i.e. a vector with magnitude equal to the length of the infinitesimal line element, and direction given by the tangent to the curve )
  is the vector area of an infinitesimal element of surface  (that is, a vector with magnitude equal to the area of the infinitesimal surface element, and direction normal to surface .
  is the curl operator.

Ambiguities and sign conventions
There are a number of ambiguities in the above definitions that require clarification and a choice of convention.
These ambiguities are resolved by the right-hand rule: With the palm of the right-hand toward the area of integration, and the index-finger pointing along the direction of line-integration, the outstretched thumb points in the direction that must be chosen for the vector area . Also the current passing in the same direction as  must be counted as positive. The right hand grip rule can also be used to determine the signs.
Second, there are infinitely many possible surfaces  that have the curve  as their border. (Imagine a soap film on a wire loop, which can be deformed by moving the wire). Which of those surfaces is to be chosen? If the loop does not lie in a single plane, for example, there is no one obvious choice.  The answer is that it does not matter; by Stokes' theorem, the integral is the same for any surface with boundary , since the integrand is the curl of a smooth field (i.e. exact). In practice, one usually chooses the most convenient surface (with the given boundary) to integrate over.

Free current versus bound current

The electric current that arises in the simplest textbook situations would be classified as "free current"—for example, the current that passes through a wire or battery. In contrast, "bound current" arises in the context of bulk materials that can be magnetized and/or polarized. (All materials can to some extent.)

When a material is magnetized (for example, by placing it in an external magnetic field), the electrons remain bound to their respective atoms, but behave as if they were orbiting the nucleus in a particular direction, creating a microscopic current. When the currents from all these atoms are put together, they create the same effect as a macroscopic current, circulating perpetually around the magnetized object. This magnetization current  is one contribution to "bound current".

The other source of bound current is bound charge. When an electric field is applied, the positive and negative bound charges can separate over atomic distances in polarizable materials, and when the bound charges move, the polarization changes, creating another contribution to the "bound current", the polarization current .

The total current density  due to free and bound charges is then:

with   the "free" or "conduction" current density.

All current is fundamentally the same, microscopically. Nevertheless, there are often practical reasons for wanting to treat bound current differently from free current. For example, the bound current usually originates over atomic dimensions, and one may wish to take advantage of a simpler theory intended for larger dimensions. For a detailed definition of free current and bound current, and the proof that the two formulations are equivalent, see the "proof" section below.

Shortcomings of the original formulation of the circuital law

There are two important issues regarding the circuital law that require closer scrutiny. First, there is an issue regarding the continuity equation for electrical charge.  In vector calculus, the identity for the divergence of a curl states that the divergence of the curl of a vector field must always be zero. Hence

and so the original Ampère's circuital law implies that

But in general, reality follows the continuity equation for electric charge:

which is nonzero for a time-varying charge density. An example occurs in a capacitor circuit where time-varying charge densities exist on the plates.

Second, there is an issue regarding the propagation of electromagnetic waves. For example, in free space, where

The circuital law implies that

but to maintain consistency with the continuity equation for electric charge, we must have

To treat these situations, the contribution of displacement current must be added to the current term in the circuital law.

James Clerk Maxwell conceived of displacement current as a polarization current in the dielectric vortex sea, which he used to model the magnetic field hydrodynamically and mechanically. He added this displacement current to Ampère's circuital law at equation 112 in his 1861 paper "On Physical Lines of Force".

Displacement current

In free space, the displacement current is related to the time rate of change of electric field.

In a dielectric the above contribution to displacement current is present too, but a major contribution to the displacement current is related to the polarization of the individual molecules of the dielectric material. Even though charges cannot flow freely in a dielectric, the charges in molecules can move a little under the influence of an electric field. The positive and negative charges in molecules separate under the applied field, causing an increase in the state of polarization, expressed as the polarization density .  A changing state of polarization is equivalent to a current.

Both contributions to the displacement current are combined by defining the displacement current as:

where the electric displacement field is defined as:

The first term on the right hand side is present everywhere, even in a vacuum. It doesn't involve any actual movement of charge, but it nevertheless has an associated magnetic field, as if it were an actual current. Some authors apply the name displacement current to only this contribution.

The second term on the right hand side is the displacement current as originally conceived by Maxwell, associated with the polarization of the individual molecules of the dielectric material.

Maxwell's original explanation for displacement current focused upon the situation that occurs in dielectric media. In the modern post-aether era, the concept has been extended to apply to situations with no material media present, for example, to the vacuum between the plates of a charging vacuum capacitor. The displacement current is justified today because it serves several requirements of an electromagnetic theory:  correct prediction of magnetic fields in regions where no free current flows; prediction of wave propagation of electromagnetic fields; and conservation of electric charge in cases where charge density is time-varying. For greater discussion see Displacement current.

Extending the original law: the Ampère–Maxwell equation

Next, the circuital equation is extended by including the polarization current, thereby remedying the limited applicability of the original circuital law.

Treating free charges separately from bound charges, the equation including Maxwell's correction in terms of the -field is (the -field is used because it includes the magnetization currents, so  does not appear explicitly, see -field and also Note):

In differential form,

On the other hand, treating all charges on the same footing (disregarding whether they are bound or free charges), the generalized Ampère's equation, also called the Maxwell–Ampère equation, is in integral form (see the "proof" section below):

In differential form,

In both forms  includes magnetization current density as well as conduction and polarization current densities. That is, the current density on the right side of the Ampère–Maxwell equation is:

Because , the charge continuity issue with Ampère's original formulation is no longer a problem.

With the addition of the displacement current, Maxwell was able to hypothesize (correctly) that light was a form of electromagnetic wave. See electromagnetic wave equation for a discussion of this important discovery.

Proof of equivalence
Proof that the formulations of the circuital law in terms of free current are equivalent to the formulations involving total current

In this proof, we will show that the equation

is equivalent to the equation

Note that we are only dealing with the differential forms, not the integral forms, but that is sufficient since the differential and integral forms are equivalent in each case, by the Kelvin–Stokes theorem.

and the following relation to the bound current:

where

is called the magnetization current density, and

is the polarization current density. Taking the equation for :

Consequently, referring to the definition of the bound current:

as was to be shown.

Ampère's circuital law in cgs units
In cgs units, the integral form of the equation, including Maxwell's correction, reads

where  is the speed of light.

The differential form of the equation (again, including Maxwell's correction) is

See also

 Biot–Savart law
 Displacement current
 Capacitance
 Ampèrian magnetic dipole model
 Electromagnetic wave equation
 Maxwell's equations
 Faraday's law of induction
 Polarization density
 Electric current
 Vector calculus
 Stokes' theorem

Notes

Further reading

External links

 MISN-0-138 Ampere's Law (PDF file) by Kirby Morgan for Project PHYSNET.
 MISN-0-145 The Ampere–Maxwell Equation; Displacement Current (PDF file) by J. S. Kovacs for Project PHYSNET.
A Dynamical Theory of the Electromagnetic Field  Maxwell's paper of 1864

Ampere's law
Ampere's law
Maxwell's equations
Electromagnetism